L'Étranger may refer to:

Books
 "L'Étranger", a poem by Charles Baudelaire
 The Stranger (Camus novel), a 1942 novel by Albert Camus
 L'étranger series, a BL manga series by Kanna Kii

Music
 L'Étranger (band), a 1980s Canadian punk band
 "L'Étranger", a song (1934) by Édith Piaf
 "L'étranger (voleur d'eau)", a 2018 song by Christine and the Queens
 L'étranger, an opera by Vincent d'Indy